Loiselle is a French surname. Notable people with the surname include:

Bernard Loiselle (b. 1948), Canadian federal lawyer and politician
Bette A. Loiselle (b. 1957), American ornithologist and ecologist
Claude Loiselle (b. 1963), retired Canadian professional hockey player who moved to center position
Gérard Loiselle (1921–1994), Quebec federal deputy for Sainte-Anne and Saint-Henri
Gilles Loiselle (b. 1929), administrator, diplomat, senior civil servant, journalist, and Canadian politician
Hélène Loiselle (1928–2013), Canadian actress
Nicole Loiselle (b. 1954), former Canadian politician, Liberal MP for the provincial conscription of Saint-Henri in Quebec between 1989 and 2007

See also
 Jean-Louis-Auguste Loiseleur-Deslongchamps botanist whose standard author abbreviation is Loisel
 Loysel (surname) – pronounced the same

References 
 This article was translated from the equivalent article in French Wikipedia. Retrieved 25 August 2020.

French-language surnames